Mystery 6 is a South Korean horror mockumentary that aired on Mnet in 2006. It stars the boyband Super Junior, with its member, Donghae as the main character. The series consists of hidden cameras, interviews and a narrative "documentary" on investigating the truth behind a former tenant's death in Super Junior's apartment. It was hosted by Kang Won Rae.

Storyline

Episode 1: Black Eye
Super Junior appear on the show voicing concerns over Donghae's strange nightmares, and that they had caused him to become increasingly weak. Donghae explains his dream as seeing a ghost hanging over him. Special guest Harisu also tells of a ghostly encounter she had in Japan, and had visited a psychic to learn more about the ghost. Seeing that this was a similar situation, Super Junior allow security cameras to film inside their dorms in the next 6 weeks. In the first week, a strange figure appears in the CCTV in a corner sitting beside Donghae's bed.

Episode 2: Cursed Diary
In the flashback, a radio broadcast reports the murder-suicide of a man and his family while a girl cowers in her room, writing in her diary. A dark figure barges in and kills her with a golf club. Donghae abruptly wakes up from the nightmare. The manager tells the weakened Donghae that his schedules have been canceled in order for him to rest. Meanwhile, Heechul goes on the set of his drama and Leeteuk and Kangin visits before attending their other schedules. On the way, they passed a strange little girl in the street. Kangin, Sungmin and Ryeowook return to the dorm. At their room, Sungmin go to bathroom and find Donghae unconscious on the bathroom floor. Then Kangin carried him to his room. As Donghae rests with Kibum (who trying soothe him by holding his hand for a while), the other members find a diary that belonged to a teenage girl while clearing out the former tenant's belongings. In her entries, it is revealed that she had suffered nightmares just like Donghae, and eventually it got worse. In the CCTV, the ghostly figure appears again, this time standing up.

Episode 3: Evil Spirit
Donghae is distracted at dance practice. To cheer him up, the members have a freestyle dance session. Leeteuk suggests they seek professional help to determine why a ghost is haunting Donghae. An exorcist is called in, and she informs Donghae that the spirit is very evil and vengeful. To cheer him up after hearing the bad news, Kangin takes Donghae to the gym. Reading the later entries in the diary, the girl Park Gayoung has more violent dreams, and blames it on her father. She writes that she starts seeing and hearing things. Super Junior rehearse for a live performance of Miracle, but because of eerie ghostly noises from the music, they are forced to instead lipsynch. They are informed by their manager that Gayoung was murdered by an intruder. Shindong, Eunhyuk and Kangin make kimbap for Donghae, while Sungmin and Ryeowook go to the recording studio. Suddenly, the power is cut off and Sungmin is briefly trapped inside the recording booth. When the power returns, the crew take a picture for the technician's birthday. Doing this, they capture the figure of the ghost standing behind Sungmin in the photograph.

Episode 4: Forbidden Journey
Despite everything, Donghae becomes more and more depressed and isolated from the other members. He takes a moment alone and calls his mom. Leeteuk, Eunhyuk and Shindong take Donghae to a hypnosis therapy session, and the hypnotist puts him into a trance. Donghae writes down what the ghost is saying to him, the members try to interpret the scribbled words. The mother of Park Gayoung is tracked and she tells how her husband had killed Gayoung and himself in a drunken rage. She also revealed that a boy who lived there before Park Ga Young moved in had also died under mysterious circumstances, while in the Philippines. He had been smoking and found out his girlfriend liked someone else. He took her with him on his bike and got into an accident only killing his girlfriend. Super Junior travel to Thailand for a concert. That evening while relaxing by the pool, Leeteuk and Eunhyuk see Donghae drowning in the water.

Episode 5: Witch Hunt
Leeteuk jumps into the water and saves Donghae as Eunhyuk frantically watches and then pulls him out of the water. They are able to revive him after Leeteuk performs CPR, but Donghae is visibly distraught by the accident, saying he felt as if his legs were being dragged down. The next morning, Sungmin and Siwon tell that they also saw ghosts in their sleep the night before. Super Junior go for a day out in Thailand, visiting a zoo and trying out Thai boxing. Later, Ryeowook asks the manager to find Gayoung's mother in order to take another look at the diary, only to discover that she has disappeared. Gayoung tells how a classmate named Lim Joomi had committed suicide, and that she is haunting her. On the internet, a photograph is posted of Joomi, and her reputation as a vicious bully resulted in receiving horrible comments by netizens. This abuse ultimately led to her suicide. In the diary, Gayoung writes that the ghost begins telling her "Will you die too?" Looking back at the scribbled note Donghae had written during his trance, it is revealed to be the same words.

Episode 6: Deadly Truth
Ryeowook and Sungmin are guests on Kangin's radio show, but minutes before broadcast, Ryeowook suddenly disappears. When he is found, he is trapped inside a cubicle with an unknown force pressing him against the door. After getting him out, they barely make it in time for the broadcast. More research on Lim Joomi's death leads to finding out that the rumors were spread by her former friend Yang Jihyun. With a hidden camera, Yang Jihyun is interviewed at her workplace, saying that she had never thought her actions would result in Joomi taking her life. Jihyun visits Joomi's grave, tearfully asking for forgiveness. Meanwhile, Leeteuk reads through Gayoung's last entries, written just moments before her death. He finds a hidden page that had been glued together. It is then discovered that Gayoung's mother, not her father, had killed her. With Donghae still resting in their dorm, Leeteuk and Shindong frantically try to warn him by phone, at the same time Gayoung's mother appears at the door, repeatedly ringing the doorbell. Donghae wakes up and picks up the phone first before checking the door, but no one is there.

In the end, with the revelations, Gayoung's mother is put into care and Donghae stops having nightmares. The members all do a self-cam of their experiences, with Donghae voicing his relief and thanking his fans for their support. However, as he stands up from his bed to turn off the camera, the ghost is sitting behind him.

References

M-Net Homepage

Super Junior television series
2006 South Korean television series debuts
2006 South Korean television series endings
Mnet television dramas